Davide Mondonico (born 25 May 1997) is an Italian footballer who plays as a defender for  club Ancona on loan from Crotone.

Career

Early career
Davide Mondonico spent much of his youth career in A.C. Milan's youth system, approximately a decade between 2006 and 2016. Despite never signing a pro contract with Milan, Mondonico made his lone appearance for the club in a friendly match in September 2015.

AlbinoLeffe
In 2016, Mondonico joined Serie C club AlbinoLeffe. He made his league debut for the club on 22 October 2016, coming on as an 85th-minute substitute for Carmine Giorgione in a 3-1 victory over Teramo.

Crotone
On 11 June 2021, he signed a 3-year contract with Crotone. On 30 July 2022, Mondonico was loaned to Ancona, with an option to buy.

References

External links

1997 births
Living people
Italian footballers
Association football defenders
U.C. AlbinoLeffe players
F.C. Crotone players
U.S. Ancona 1905 players
Serie C players
Serie B players